Iron sulfate may refer to:

 Ferrous sulfate, Iron(II) sulfate, FeSO4
 Ferric sulfate, Iron(III) sulfate, Fe2(SO4)3